Wheelchair Sports NSW is the peak New South Wales sports organisation that assists people with disabilities ranging from spinal cord injury, spina bifida, amputation, paraplegia, quadriplegia to other similar disabling conditions. The organisation was established as the Paraplegic Sports Club, a section of the Paraplegic Association of NSW (also known as ParaQuad) in October 1961. It offers a range of sports programs, facilities and financial support from beginners to Paralympians.

History

In April 1961, the Paraplegic and Quadriplegic Association of NSW (later known as ParaQuad NSW) as established to create opportunities  for people with a spinal disability.  In October 1961, the Paraplegic Sports Club of NSW, a section of the Association was formed with the foundation members being Kevin Betts, Ashley Coops, Trevor French, Daphne Hilton and Bruce Thwaite. They were later joined by Eric Magennis and Harold Squires. The Association viewed sport as rehabilitation in its formative years. In the late 1970s and early 1980s, the Club made a transition from a sports club to a structured statewide organization and in January 1987 it became the NSW Wheelchair Sports Association. In 2006, it changed its name from NSW Wheelchair Sports Association Inc. to Wheelchair Sports NSW (WS NSW). To celebrate 50 years of operation in 2011, the book Pushing Strong was published.

Services

Sports

It supports the following sports: archery, wheelchair basketball, cue sports, fencing, hand cycling lawn bowls, powerlifting, wheelchair rugby, shooting, swimming, wheelchair tennis and track and field.

Facilities
The Kevin Betts Stadium (known as the Coca-Cola Stadium until 1992) was opened on 13 May 1986. The Association received support from Coca-Cola, Blacktown City Council, Rotary Club of Holroyd and Rotaract in its construction.

Events
Wheelchair Sports NSW has managed several major events including: 
 7th National Paraplegic and Quadriplegic Games in 1972
 FESPIC Games in 1977
 NSW Wheelchair Tennis Championships commenced in 1983 and is now held annually
 Oz Day 10K race first held on 26 January 1990 and is now a major Australia Day event held in The Rocks, Sydney
 1998 Gold Cup – Wheelchair Basketball World Championship

Notable NSW Wheelchair Paralympians
Selected NSW high achieving wheelchair athletes: 
Athletics – Louise Sauvage, Kurt Fearnley, Terry Giddy, Gary Hooper, Daphne Hilton (also swimming and table tennis)
Powerlifting – Vic Renalson (also athletics)
Rowing – John Maclean
Shooting – Alan Chadwick
Swimming – Matthew Levy
Wheelchair basketball – Liesl Tesch (also sailing), Lisa Edmonds Troy Sachs, Michael Callahan, Gerry Hewson
Wheelchair rugby – Ryley Batt
Wheelchair tennis – David Hall

External links
Wheelchair Sports NSW website

Further reading
Jeanette. Pushing strong : celebrating fifty years of wheelchair sports NSW : 1961–2011. Caringbah, N.S.W.: Playright Publishing, 2011

References

Parasports organisations in Australia
Organisations based in New South Wales